Maasilamani is a 2009 Indian Tamil-language romance action comedy film directed by R. N. R. Manohar and distributed by Sun Pictures. It stars Nakul and Sunaina and in their second collaboration after Kadhalil Vizhunthen, while Pawan, Santhanam, Karunas, Srinath, and M. S. Baskar, among others, play supporting roles. The music was composed by D. Imman, while editing was done by Manoj. The movie was released on 19 June 2009.

Plot 
Maasilamani aka Maasi (Nakul) is an orphan living in a lower-middle-class colony. With a heart of gold, he is a popular guy who takes up local issues, fights for them, and is considered rowdy by those who do not know him. Enters the heroine Divya (Sunaina), a rich upper-middle-class girl who is a dance instructor and with whom Maasi falls in love at first sight. However, Divya shows aversion to his rowdyism and gets offended by his proposal. Urged by his friends, Maasi attempts to win her family by being a good person and dons another name, Mani. All are aware that Mani and Maasi are one person except Divya. When Divya finds out the truth, she gets into a dilemma as to whom she has to choose. Bhoopathy (Pawan), the new local corrupt inspector who is also behind Divya, is determined to flop Maasi’s plans and prove that Mani is none other than Maasi. Maasi does death drama for Divya and wins over her.

Cast 

Nakul as Maasilamani, a well-known do-gooder who falls in love with Divya and Divya's love interest turned fiancee.
Sunaina as Divya Ramanathan, a dancer instructor who abhors Maasi's aggressive ways and Maasilamani's love interest turned fiancee, Thalisdar and Mrs. Ramanathan's daughter and Tinku's elder sister.
Pawan as Inspector Pirmalsamy Bhopathy, a new police inspector who got transferred in Ashok Nagar station who wants to marry Divya but hates Maasi and Maasi's enemy but he realised his mistake in climax.
Santhanam as Pazhani, Maasi's friend.
Srinath as Kathir, Maasi's friend.
M. S. Bhaskar as 'Coma' Ramaswamy, a man who wants to become an actor and he was betrayed by an unknown man by stealing his money.(played by Karunas)
Karunas
Delhi Ganesh as Thalisdar Ramanathan, Divya and Tinku's father
Meera Krishnan as Mrs. Ramanathan, Divya and Tinku's mother
Santhana Bharathi as Councillor
Manobala as Advocate
Raj Kapoor as Kanthuvatti
T. K. Kala as the woman who was assulted by Bhopathy
Rajendranath as Police Inspector
KVM Kannan as Judge
Tatineni Rajeshwari as Patthi,Divya's grandmother
Tharini
V. Mahadevan
Harini as Priya, Divya 's dance student
Mahima
Azhagu
Krishna
Unknown as Tinku, Divya's sister

Marketing

Promotions 
The first photo of the film was released on January 8, 2009. Marketing was led by a team from India. The promotional activity led to the success of the movie and it was appreciated by Marimuthu in the event E Entrepreneurship Workshop at Kamalam College of Arts and Science. Manohar, the writer of the movie, felicitated the event.

Music 

The songs were composed by D. Imman. The album consists of five songs.

Reception
Behindwoods wrote "Masilamani gives you an instant hangover of having watched too many movies over a very short period of time. The script feels like a medley-mash of movies released over the past decade. And it wouldn’t be possible for us to name each of them since the list runs to pages." Indiaglitz wrote "As said old wine in a new bottle, SUN Pictures' 'Masilamani' definitely adheres to this quote. The movie reflects a mix of several masala flicks with a dash of refinement."

Box office
Maasilamani was a commercial success at the box office grossing $2 million.

References

External links
 AGS Entertainment Website

2009 films
2000s Tamil-language films
2000s masala films
2009 action comedy films
Indian action comedy films
Films scored by D. Imman
2009 directorial debut films
2009 comedy films